Riachuelo is a municipality located in the Brazilian state of Sergipe. Riachuelo has a population density of 130 inhabitants per square kilometer. Riachuelo borders the municipalities of Laranjeiras, Divina Pastora, Santa Rosa de Lima, and Areia Branca, all within the state of Sergipe. The municipality is site of the Nossa Senhora da Penha Sugar Plantation and the Chapel of the Nossa Senhora da Penha Sugar Plantation. The chapel was listed as a historic structure by National Institute of Historic and Artistic Heritage (IPHAN) in 1943, but has fallen into an advanced state of neglect and decay and is considered abandoned.

References

Municipalities in Sergipe
Populated places established in 1874
1874 establishments in Brazil